Boomerang is an American comedy television series, serving as a sequel to the 1992 film of the same name. The series premiered on February 12, 2019, on BET.

On April 2, 2019, it was announced that the series was renewed for a second season, which premiered on March 11, 2020. In August 2021, co-producer Lena Waithe announced that the series would not return for a third season.

Premise
Boomerang revolves around "a successful executive who finds that his lifestyle choices have turned back on him when his new boss turns out to be a bigger deviant than he is. It is described as an updated version that explores contemporary workplace dynamics, including the changing role of gender, office politics, relationships and the conflicts between Generation X and millennials."

Cast and characters

Main
Tequan Richmond as Bryson, ambitious estranged son of Jacqueline Broyer (played by Robin Givens).
Tetona Jackson as Simone Graham, daughter of Marcus and Angela Graham  (played by Eddie Murphy and Halle Berry).
Leland B. Martin as Ari, a bisexual aspiring director who struggles with his toxic behavior. Loosely inspired by Tyler (played by Martin Lawrence) in the original.
Lala Milan as Tia Reid, a former stripper and performance artist. She later becomes a social media maven with the help of Simone. Loosely based Strangé (played by Grace Jones)
Brittany Inge as Crystal Garrett (recurring, season 1; main, season 2), a former ad employee and best friend of Simone. She is recently divorced from David. She struggles to find her voice in the friend group.
RJ Walker as David (recurring, season 1; main, season 2), an up-and-coming preacher who struggles to find his faith. He is recently divorced from Crystal

Recurring
Paula Newsome as Victoria Jackson (season 1)
Kim Alex Hall as Rocky (season 1), Tia's girlfriend

Episodes

Season 1 (2019)

Season 2 (2020)

Production

Development
On April 11, 2018, it was announced that BET had given a series order to the production for a first season consisting of ten episodes. A writer and producing team had yet to be determined but the series was expected be produced by Paramount Television. On September 24, 2018, it was announced that Lena Waithe and Ben Cory Jones would write the series' pilot episode together and executive produce alongside Halle Berry and Rishi Rajani. Jones was also expected to serve as the showrunner for the series and Dime Davis was set to direct the pilot episode. Waithe's production company Hillman Grad Productions was also slated to be involved with the series. On December 19, 2018, it was announced that the series would premiere on February 12, 2019.

Casting
In October 2018, it was announced that Tequan Richmond, Tetona Jackson, Leland Martin, and Lala Milan had been cast in series regular roles and that RJ Walker, Paula Newsome, Brittany Inge, Joey BadA$$, and Kimberly Hall would appear in a recurring capacity.

Filming
Principal photography for the series took place from October to December 2018 in Georgia. In October 2018, filming took place in the Buckhead area of Atlanta and in East Point. In November 2018, the series was shooting in the Mechanicsville neighborhood of Atlanta and on Ponce de Leon Avenue near the Ponce City Market in Atlanta.

Release

Marketing
On January 6, 2019, the first trailer for the series was released.

Premiere
On January 26, 2019, the series held a screening during the 2019 Sundance Film Festival. The event was followed by a panel discussion hosted by Macro Lodge and featuring executive producer Lena Waithe, showrunner Ben Cory Jones, and director Dime Davis.

Reception
On Rotten Tomatoes season 1 has a score of 100% based on reviews from 12 critics.

References

External links

2010s American black sitcoms
2020s American black sitcoms
2019 American television series debuts
American sequel television series
BET original programming
English-language television shows
Live action television shows based on films
Television series by Paramount Television